ASVEL Basket, commonly known as ASVEL or sometimes as ASVEL Lyon-Villeurbanne, and also known as LDLC ASVEL for sponsorship reasons,  is a French professional basketball team that is located in the city of Villeurbanne, which is a suburb of Lyon, France. The club, which is the basketball section of the ASVEL multi-sports club, competes in the top-tier level French Pro A League. The club's home games are played at L'Astroballe, which seats 5,556 people.

Founded in 1948, the team is the most successful in French basketball with 21 Pro A championships and 10 French Cup titles.

In 2014, Tony Parker became the president of the club. In 2017, Nicolas Batum became the club's director of basketball operations. In June 2019, football club Olympique Lyonnais purchased a 25% stake in the ASVEL men's team, plus a 10% stake in the ASVEL women's team, in a deal worth around €3.7 million. The deal also included a plan for a new EuroLeague-standard arena.

History 
The parent club was founded in 1948, with the merger of two multi-sport clubs in Lyon and vicinity; ASVEL is an acronym combining the names of the predecessor clubs—Association Sportive Villeurbanne and Éveil Lyonnais. In its history, ASVEL has won 20 French Pro A League championships, 10 French Cups, two French Supercups, one French Federation Cup, and one Semaine des As Cup (French Pro A Leaders Cup), which makes it the most titled basketball club in France.

In 2014, former San Antonio Spurs star and  French national team player, Tony Parker, became the club's president. 

In the French Pro A League 2015–16 season, ASVEL won its 18th French League title, after beating Strasbourg IG 3 games to 2 in the French Pro A League Finals. ASVEL was down 2–0 in the series, but won three games in a row to take the championship.

In March 2017, NBA player, Nicolas Batum, became a shareholder in Infinity Nine Sports, the main investment company behind the club, and took over the position as director of basketball operations. Tony Parker remained majority owner, and ASVEL President. In 2018, the club signed a 10-year name sponsorship agreement with LDLC. The club also changed its main team colors from the original white and green to white and black, and changed its main logo design.

In 2019, ASVEL returned to the EuroLeague after the organisation decided to give the team a wild card for two years.

In the 2021–22 season, ASVEL won its third Pro A championship in a row, its first three-peat in 32 years after beating Monaco in the Finals.

Arenas

L'Astroballe, with a seating capacity of 5,556 has been used as the long-time home arena of ASVEL. 

In July 2016, ASVEL announced that it would build a new multi-functional arena, with a projected seating capacity between 12,000 and 16,000 people, depending on the configuration. The arena is projected to cost €60 million. The new arena will be named the LDLC Arena, and its design and construction were given to architectural firm Populous and Citinea. Construction began in January 2022 and is expected to be finished by the end of 2023.

Logos and branding

On September 11, 2018, the club changed its name to LDLC ASVEL for sponsorship reasons. Along with this change, the club changed its main colors from green to black and white. The decision was made with the explanation that, "when you are European, green is a colour that does not make you dream", and was followed by criticism from fans. The new logo, used since 2018, consists of the number four, which refers to ASVEL legend Alain Gilles, while also keeping the V that was used in the previous logo.

Honours

Domestic competitions
French League 
 Winners (21): 1948–49, 1949–50, 1951–52, 1954–55, 1955–56, 1956–57, 1963–64, 1965–66, 1967–68, 1968–69, 1970–71, 1971–72, 1974–75, 1976–77, 1980–81, 2001–02, 2008–09, 2015–16, 2018–19, 2020–21, 2021–22
 Runners-up (7): 1953–54, 1958–59, 1995–96, 1996–97, 1998–99, 1999–00, 2002–03

French Cup
 Winners (10): 1952–53, 1956–57, 1964–65, 1966–67, 1995–96, 1996–97, 2000–01, 2007–08, 2018-19, 2020–21
 Runners-up (5): 1953–54, 1954–55, 1958–59, 2001–02, 2015–16

A Leaders Cup
 Winners (2): 2010, 2023
 Runners-up (2): 2017, 2020

French Super Cup
 Winners (2): 2009, 2016
 Runners-up (1): 2008

Federation Cup (defunct)
 Winners (1): 1983–84
 Runners-up (1): 1981–82

European competitions
EuroLeague
 Semifinalists (1): 1975–76 
 3rd place (1): 1977–78
 4th place (1): 1996–97
 Final Four (1): 1997
FIBA Saporta Cup
 Runners-up (1): 1982–83
 Semifinalists (2): 1984–85, 1986–87
FIBA Korać Cup
 Semifinalists (1): 1995–96
Latin Cup
 3rd place (2): 1953, 1966

Other competitions
Villeurbanne, France Invitational Game
 Winners (1): 2020

Season by season

Season by season results of the club in national, cup, and European competitions.

 Cancelled due to the COVID-19 pandemic in Europe.

International record

Players

Current roster

Depth chart

Squad changes for the 2022–2023 season

In

Out

Retired numbers

Notable players

Head coaches

Club Presidents

Individual club records
Individual club record holders, while players of ASVEL.

ASVEL players with the most French League championships
ASVEL players with the most French League championships won, while members of the club.

Sponsors
LDLC

References

External links
Official website
Euroleague.net Team Page
French League Profile 
Eurobasket.com Team Page

ASVEL Basket
1948 establishments in France
Basketball teams established in 1948
Basketball teams in France
Sport in Lyon